"A Face in the Crowd" is a song co-written and recorded by Tom Petty. It was released in February 1990 as the fourth single from his first solo album Full Moon Fever. It peaked at number 46 on the U.S. Billboard Hot 100 chart.

Content
The narrator discusses falling in love with someone who used to be just "a face in the crowd."

Other performances
Kathleen Edwards released a version of the song on the Sweetheart: Love Songs covers compilation from 2004 on Hear Music.

Josh Klinghoffer, formerly of the Red Hot Chili Peppers, briefly performed the song at the band's October 7, 2017 show in Texas in tribute to Petty, who died five days earlier,

A cover of the song by Spoon was released on March 12, 2021.

Charts

References

1990 singles
Tom Petty songs
Songs written by Tom Petty
Songs written by Jeff Lynne
1989 songs
Song recordings produced by Jeff Lynne
Rock ballads
MCA Records singles